Zmeskal or Zmeškal (Czech feminine: Zmeškalová) is a surname. Notable people with the surname include:

Kim Zmeskal (born 1976), American gymnast and gymnastics coach
Tomáš Zmeškal (born 1966), Czech writer

See also
 

Czech-language surnames